The 2011 season is the 89th season of competitive football in Ecuador.

National leagues

Serie A

Champion: Deportivo Quito (5th title)
Runner-up: Emelec
International cup qualifiers:
2011 Copa Sudamericana: Emelec, Deportivo Quito
2012 Copa Libertadores: Emelec, Deportivo Quito, El Nacional
2012 Copa Sudamericana: Deportivo Quito
Relegated: Imbabura, ESPOLI

Serie B
Winner: Técnico Universitario (5th title)
Runner-up: Macará
Promoted: Técnico Universitario, Macará
Relegated: LDU Portoviejo, Atlético Audaz

Segunda Categoria
Winner: Ferroviarios (1st title)
Runner-up: Mushuc Runa
Promoted: Ferroviarios, Mushuc Runa

Clubs in international competitions

Deportivo Quito

Copa Libertadores

Copa Sudamericana

Emelec

Copa Libertadores

Copa Sudamericana

LDU Quito

Copa Libertadores

Copa Sudamericana

National teams

Senior team

Copa América

Ecuador will participate in their 25th Copa América, to be held in Argentina. They were drawn into Group B.

2014 FIFA World Cup qualification

Friendlies

Under-20 team

South American Youth Championship

FIFA U-20 World Cup

Ecuador qualified for the 2011 FIFA U-20 World Cup in Colombia. They draw was held on April 27 and Ecuador was drawn into Group C with Australia, Costa Rica, and Spain.

Under-17 team

South American Under-17 Football Championship

FIFA U-17 World Cup

Ecuador qualified for the 2011 FIFA U-17 World Cup. The draw was held on May 17 and Ecuador was drawn into Group E with Burkina Faso, Germany, and Panama.

Pan American Games

Ecuador qualified for the 2011 Pan American Games.

References

External links
Official website  of the Ecuadorian Football Federation 
2011 league seasons on RSSSF

 
2011